Charles August Pavelko (born August 15, 1915, date of death unknown) was an American football player and coach. He was a quarterback and punter for a very successful football team at Santa Clara University in the mid 1930s. He served as the head football coach at California Polytechnic State University in San Luis Obispo, California from 1948 to 1949, compiling a record of 7–11.

Head coaching record

References

1915 births
Year of death missing
American football halfbacks
American football punters
American football quarterbacks
Cal Poly Mustangs football coaches
Los Angeles Bulldogs players
Santa Clara Broncos football players